Ig delta chain C region is a protein that in humans is encoded by the IGHD gene.

References

Further reading